The Capitulation of Wittenberg was a treaty on 19 May 1547 by which John Frederick I, Elector of Saxony, was compelled to resign the title of elector. The Electorate of Saxony and most of his territory, including Wittenberg, passed from the elder Ernestine line to the cadet Albertine line of the House of Wettin.  

Wittenberg had become the focus of the Protestant Reformation. In 1517, Martin Luther had nailed his 95 Theses against Indulgences on the door of the castle church at Wittenberg, the opening act of the Reformation. In 1520 he burned the papal bull condemning him, and in 1534 the first Lutheran Bible was printed there. The Elector of Saxony was the most important patron of the Lutheran Reformation.

In 1547, Emperor Charles V, with the assistance of the Duke of Alva, captured Wittenberg after the Battle of Mühlberg, where John Frederick I was taken prisoner. The Duke of Alva then presided over a court-martial and condemned John Frederick to death. To save his life, the Elector conceded the defeat of Wittenberg and  resigned the government of his country in favor of his relative, Maurice of Saxony. His sentence was thereupon commuted to imprisonment for life. Rescued on 1 September, 1552, he returned to Saxony in a triumphal march, and removed the seat of government to Weimar.

Wittenberg declined after 1547, when Dresden, residence of the Albertine dukes, replaced it as the Saxon capital.

1547 in the Holy Roman Empire
1547 in law
1547 treaties
16th century in Saxony
Wittenberg